Virgil Dridea (17 November 1940 – 29 May 2022), also known as Puiu Dridea, was a Romanian football player and manager.

Playing career
Virgil "Puiu" Dridea was born on 17 November 1940 in Ploiești, Romania and started to play junior level football at local club, Petrolul where his first coach was Mihai Cristache, afterwards working with Emil Avasilichioaie and on 24 August 1958 he made his senior debut being used by coach Ilie Oană in a 3–0 Divizia A victory against Jiul Petroșani, that being his only appearance in that season as the club won the title. From 1959 until 1961 he played for Știința București in Divizia B, afterwards returning at Petrolul where he won the 1962–63 Cupa României and another title in the 1965–66 season where he was used by coach Constantin Cernăianu in 18 matches in which he scored 6 goals, including a goal from a corner kick in the 1–0 victory against Rapid București. Dridea also played two games for The Yellow Wolves in the first round of the 1966–67 European Cup against Liverpool which include a 3–1 victory, however they did not manage to qualify to the next round. His last Divizia A game took place on 3 September 1968 in a 3–1 victory against Jiul Petroșani, having a total of 82 matches and 12 goals scored in the competition, afterwards going to play for two years in Divizia C at Metalul Plopeni where he ended his career.

Managerial career
Virgil Dridea started coaching as an assistant from 1970 until 1977 under head coaches Gheorghe Bărbulescu, Marian Alexandru, Nicolae Marinescu and Adalbert Marosi, being named head coach of the team in the second half of the 1976–77 Divizia B season, leading the team until 1983, a period in which the team relegated to Divizia C but he stayed with the club, helping it promote back after one season. In 1983 he went to work abroad in Angola at Petro do Huambo until 1985, then he returned to Romania at Prahova Ploiești which he led for three years in Divizia B. In 1988 he took charge of Petrolul Ploiești, taking it from Divizia B to Divizia A and later to the 1990–91 UEFA Cup where they were eliminated by Anderlecht. In 1992 he had his second experience abroad going to coach for one year the Syrian national team, afterwards coaching Dacia Unirea Brăila which he earned a 2nd place in Divizia B, worked for a while in a second spell at Metalul Plopeni, had second experience in Syria at Al-Jaish and earned another 2nd Divizia B place with Midia Năvodari. He returned back to Divizia A football during his second spell at Petrolul in the 1999–2000 season in which he earned two historical victories against Steaua București, a 5–1 at home and a 4–1 on the Ghencea stadium, also a 4–2 home victory against Mircea Lucescu's Rapid București who were the title holders, afterwards going to coach in the lower leagues for a second spell at Midia, later at Cimentul Fieni, Chindia Târgoviște and for a third spell at Plopeni, retiring after a third spell at Petrolul which took place from July until December 2004. Virgil Dridea has a total of 134 games managed in Divizia A, all at Petrolul consisting of 58 victories, 23 draws and 53 losses.

Personal life
Virgil Dridea's brother, Mircea was also a footballer and a manager, they played together at Petrolul Ploiești, winning two Divizia A titles together and were opponents as managers in the 1981–82 Divizia B season when Virgil coached Metalul Plopeni and Mircea coached Petrolul. Virgil Dridea died on 29 May 2022.

Honours

Player
Petrolul Ploiești
Divizia A: 1958–59, 1965–66
Cupa României: 1962–63

Manager
Metalul Plopeni
Divizia C: 1982–83
Petrolul Ploiești
Divizia B: 1988–89

References

External links

1940 births
2022 deaths
Sportspeople from Ploiești
Romanian footballers
Association football midfielders
Liga I players
FC Petrolul Ploiești players
FC Sportul Studențesc București players
CSO Plopeni players
Romanian football managers
CSO Plopeni managers
Syria national football team managers
FC Petrolul Ploiești managers
AFC Dacia Unirea Brăila managers
FCM Târgoviște managers
Romanian expatriate football managers
Romanian expatriate sportspeople in Angola
Expatriate football managers in Angola
Romanian expatriate sportspeople in Syria
Expatriate football managers in Syria